Jenny Lyvette Arthur (born December 11, 1993) is an American weightlifter that qualified for the 2016 Summer Olympics.

Early life
Arthur attended Chestatee High School.

Youth career
In 2010, she won the youth national weightlifting championship.

Senior career
Arthur qualified for the 2016 Olympics by virtue of her placement at the last two World Weightlifting Championships.

References

External links

Living people
American female weightlifters
Weightlifters at the 2016 Summer Olympics
Olympic weightlifters of the United States
1993 births
World Weightlifting Championships medalists
People from Gainesville, Georgia
Sportspeople from the Atlanta metropolitan area
21st-century American women